Spring Hill Township may refer to the following townships in the United States:

 Spring Hill Township, Johnson County, Kansas
 Spring Hill Township, Stearns County, Minnesota